Anti-Indonesian sentiment or Indonesiaphobia refers to negative feelings and hatred towards Indonesia, Indonesians, and Indonesian culture.

Origins

China 
Racial discrimination against Chinese Indonesians had led to several protests in China against Indonesia.

Australia

Human rights problem 
Amnesty International and Australia government strongly condemned excessive punishment and executions of Chan and Sukumaran. Australians called for Bali boycott to save Bali Nine.

East Timor problem 
Despite Australian governments originally supported Jakarta's policies, East Timor issue created anti-Indonesian sentiment throughout the Australian community.

Papua problem 
Some Papuans and their supporters opined that Act of Free Choice did not followed New York Agreement. Even though Western New Guinea was previously part of the Dutch East Indies, they considered the governance of Papua and West Papua by Indonesia "illegal" since then. They demand a fresh independence referendum, however Indonesia oppress Papuans who demand independence or referendum.

Malaysia 
Due to the infamous Indonesia–Malaysia confrontation of 1963, and the following up of cultural and political controversies, there is an anti-Indonesian sentiment spreading among Malaysian population. In 1963, shortly after Indonesia invaded British Borneo, Malayans went into a series of anti-Indonesian protests.

During the 2022 FIFA World Cup qualification – AFC Second Round match between two countries, Indonesian fans' violent reaction after the home team suffered a shock 2–3 loss to rival Malaysia, had led to anti-Indonesian to be stemmed again in the game.

See also 
 Human rights in Indonesia
 Bali Nine
 Papua conflict
 Indonesia–Malaysia confrontation

References 

Indonesia
Indonesia
Foreign relations of Indonesia